The Monmouth Creek complex is a volcanic complex in southwestern British Columbia, Canada, located  southwest of the community of Squamish on the west side of the Squamish River mouth. It lies in the southern Pacific Ranges of the Coast Mountains and is part of the Squamish volcanic field in the southern Garibaldi Volcanic Belt, which represents the northernmost extension of the Cascade Volcanic Arc.

Its prominent and enigmatic edifice is composed of basaltic andesite to dacite of unknown age and may represent a group of dikes and lava domes that formed subglacially. At least four dikes protrude its summit. The spines are covered by welded breccia close to their bases and columnar jointing extends into the welded sequence. The most elevated lava flows and spines are composed of dacite.

References

External links
Catelogue of Canadian volcanoes: The Castle
The Castle in the Canadian Mountain Encyclopedia

Volcanoes of British Columbia
Mountains of British Columbia under 1000 metres
Garibaldi Volcanic Belt
New Westminster Land District